The Philippine green pigeon (Treron axillaris) is a pigeon in the genus Treron. It is found in the forests of the Philippines. Many authorities split the species from the pompadour green pigeon complex.

Behaviour
The Philippine green pigeon usually occurs singly or in small groups. Its flight is fast and direct, with the regular beats and an occasional sharp flick of the wings that are characteristic of pigeons in general. It eats the seeds and fruits of a wide variety of plants. It builds a stick nest in a tree and lays two white eggs.

References

Works cited
Collar, N.J. 2011. Species limits in some Philippine birds including the Greater Flameback Chrysocolaptes lucidus. Forktail number 27: 29–38.
Rasmussen, P.C., and J.C. Anderton. 2005. Birds of South Asia: the Ripley guide. Lynx Edicions and Smithsonian Institution.

External links 
 Philippine Green Pigeon: Breed Guide - Pigeonpedia

Philippine green pigeon
Endemic birds of the Philippines
Philippine green pigeon
Philippine green pigeon